The men's triple jump at the 1962 European Athletics Championships was held in Belgrade, then Yugoslavia, at JNA Stadium on 13 September 1962.

Medalists

Results

Final
13 September

Qualification
13 September

Participation
According to an unofficial count, 23 athletes from 13 countries participated in the event.

 (2)
 (3)
 (2)
 (1)
 (1)
 (2)
 (1)
 (2)
 (2)
 (3)
 (1)
 (2)
 (1)

References

Triple jump
Triple jump at the European Athletics Championships